Milanlı (also, Milanlu and Milanly) is a Kurdish village in the Qubadli Rayon of Azerbaijan.

References 

Populated places in Qubadli District